The Kvalsund Tunnel is a subsea road tunnel which links the islands of Kvaløya and Ringvassøya in Tromsø Municipality in Troms og Finnmark county, Norway. Located along Norwegian County Road 863, the tunnel runs under the Kvalsundet strait between the villages of Sørhelltaren and Nordhella. The tunnel replaced a ferry connection between the islands.

References

External links

Subsea tunnels in Norway
Road tunnels in Troms og Finnmark
Buildings and structures in Tromsø
Roads within the Arctic Circle
Tunnels completed in 1988
1988 establishments in Norway